CRSP can refer to:
  The stock ticker for CRISPR Therapeutics
  Barnabites, or Clerics Regular of Saint Paul, a Catholic religious order
  Center for Research in Security Prices at the University of Chicago
  Colorado River Storage Project
  Canadian Registered Safety Professional designation administered by the Board of Canadian Registered Safety Professionals
 Committee for a Revolutionary Socialist Party a coalition of American Trotskyist groups.